Esten William Vickroy Jr. (June 24, 1921 –May 11, 2003) was an American college football player and coach and athletics administrator. He played college football at Ohio State University from 1940 to 1942. Vickroy served as the head football coach at La Crosse State Teachers College—now known as the University of Wisconsin–La Crosse—from 1952 to 1968, compiled a record of 86–61–6. He was later the athletic director at Wisconsin–La Crosse and president of the National Association of Intercollegiate Athletics (NAIA). He is a member of the University of Wisconsin and NAIA Halls of Fame.

Head coaching record

References

External links
 

1921 births
2003 deaths
American football centers
Ohio State Buckeyes football players
Wisconsin–La Crosse Eagles athletic directors
Wisconsin–La Crosse Eagles football coaches
Sportspeople from Toledo, Ohio
Coaches of American football from Ohio
Players of American football from Ohio